Richard Sharpe (born 15 January 1967, in London, England) is an English retired soccer forward whose career in the United States included one season with Colorado Rapids of Major League Soccer.

Sharpe grew up in England, playing in the West Ham United and Leyton Orient youth systems. He moved to the United States in 1989 where he entered Florida Institute of Technology. Over four seasons, he established himself as the most successful forwards in NCAA Division II history. He holds the NCAA record for season points (112), career points (321), season goals (49) and career goals (137). He was a 1991, 1992 and 1993 first team All American. In 1991, Sharpe and his teammates also won the Division II national championship.

In 1994, Sharpe signed with the Cocoa Expos in the USISL. He promptly scored 33 goals in 15 games, leading the league. He also scored a hat trick at that year's All Star game. In 1995, he played only six games, but still scored 14 goals. He then trained with Rochdale A.F.C  In March 1996, the Colorado Rapids selected Sharpe in the second round (nineteenth overall) of the 1996 MLS Supplemental Draft. He played seventeen games with the Rapids in 1996, scoring only two goals. On 20 January 1997, the Rapids released Sharpe. In February 1997, he signed a two-year contract with the Carolina Dynamo of the USISL A-League. He injured his knee in the Dynamo's first game of the season. He returned in June, but injured his back at the beginning of the playoffs.

References

1967 births
North Carolina Fusion U23 players
Cocoa Expos players
Colorado Rapids players
Florida Institute of Technology alumni
Florida Tech Panthers men's soccer players
English footballers
English expatriate footballers
Living people
Major League Soccer players
USISL players
USL League Two players
A-League (1995–2004) players
Colorado Rapids draft picks
Association football forwards
English expatriate sportspeople in the United States
Expatriate soccer players in the United States